The Netgear MP101 was the first of a series of digital media receivers by Netgear.

Family history
The Netgear MP101's family also includes other devices such as the MP115, the EVA700 and, the EVA8000.

Appearance
The Netgear MP101 is a small brushed silver unit that can provide a link between a PC-based MP3 collection and a conventional hi-fi.

Concept

The MP101 requires a UPnP AV media server to provide access to digital media, while some other units (and the later EVA8000) can read from a Windows share directly (or a NAS device).

Netgear does not manufacture the devices itself, but they are produced instead by a third-party company and then marketed as a Netgear product.

Implementation
The MP101 is based on the ARM9 Marvell Libertas 88W8510H system-on-a-chip and has 8 MB of DRAM. Netgear licensed the ARM MP3 decoder software for use with the device.

The MP101 runs the open-source eCos real-time operating system. Netgear made the source code available online.

External links
MP101 review (December 20, 2004)

ARM press release: NetGear Builds Innovative Wireless MP3 Player Around ARM Powered SOC From Marvell (March 16, 2004)

MP101
Internet audio players